This article provides a list of Michigan military units active during the American Civil War. As a northern state, Michigan was part of the Union, and its units were active during the entire length of the war. Units included the Michigan Brigade (known as the "Wolverines"), which served under George Armstrong Custer during the Gettysburg Campaign.

Infantry
1st Michigan Volunteer Infantry Regiment (3 months)
1st Michigan Volunteer Infantry Regiment (3 years)
1st Michigan Colored Volunteer Infantry Regiment - African-American, later 102nd Regiment United States Colored Troops
2nd Michigan Volunteer Infantry Regiment
3rd Michigan Volunteer Infantry Regiment
3rd Michigan Volunteer Infantry Regiment (reorganized)
4th Michigan Volunteer Infantry Regiment
4th Michigan Volunteer Infantry Regiment (reorganized)
5th Michigan Volunteer Infantry Regiment
6th Michigan Volunteer Infantry Regiment
7th Michigan Volunteer Infantry Regiment
8th Michigan Volunteer Infantry Regiment
9th Michigan Volunteer Infantry Regiment
10th Michigan Volunteer Infantry Regiment
11th Michigan Volunteer Infantry Regiment
11th Michigan Volunteer Infantry Regiment (reorganized)
12th Michigan Volunteer Infantry Regiment
13th Michigan Volunteer Infantry Regiment
14th Michigan Volunteer Infantry Regiment
15th Michigan Volunteer Infantry Regiment
16th Michigan Volunteer Infantry Regiment - Stockton's Independent Regiment
17th Michigan Volunteer Infantry Regiment - Stonewall Regiment
18th Michigan Volunteer Infantry Regiment
19th Michigan Volunteer Infantry Regiment
20th Michigan Volunteer Infantry Regiment
21st Michigan Volunteer Infantry Regiment
22nd Michigan Volunteer Infantry Regiment
23rd Michigan Volunteer Infantry Regiment
24th Michigan Volunteer Infantry Regiment
25th Michigan Volunteer Infantry Regiment
26th Michigan Volunteer Infantry Regiment
27th Michigan Volunteer Infantry Regiment
28th Michigan Volunteer Infantry Regiment
29th Michigan Volunteer Infantry Regiment
30th Michigan Volunteer Infantry Regiment
Stanton Guard
Independent Company (Provost Guard)

Sharpshooters

1st Regiment Michigan Volunteer Sharpshooters
Hall's Independent Battalion Michigan Volunteer Sharpshooters
Brady's Independent Company Michigan Volunteer Sharpshooters
Dygert's Independent Company Michigan Volunteer Sharpshooters
Jardine's Independent Company Michigan Volunteer Sharpshooters
Company "C" 1st United States Sharpshooters Regiment
Company "I" 1st United States Sharpshooters Regiment
Company "K" 1st United States Sharpshooters Regiment
Company "B" 2nd United States Sharpshooters Regiment
Company "D" Western Sharpshooters Regiment

Cavalry
1st Michigan Volunteer Cavalry Regiment
2nd Michigan Volunteer Cavalry Regiment
3rd Michigan Volunteer Cavalry Regiment
4th Michigan Volunteer Cavalry Regiment
5th Michigan Volunteer Cavalry Regiment
6th Michigan Volunteer Cavalry Regiment
7th Michigan Volunteer Cavalry Regiment
8th Michigan Volunteer Cavalry Regiment
9th Michigan Volunteer Cavalry Regiment
10th Michigan Volunteer Cavalry Regiment
11th Michigan Volunteer Cavalry Regiment
1st United States Lancer Regiment
Chandler's Horse Guard

Artillery
1st Regiment Michigan Light Artillery
Battery "A" 1st Regiment Michigan Light Artillery – (Loomis Battery, Coldwater Artillery)
Battery "B" 1st Regiment Michigan Light Artillery
Battery "C" 1st Regiment Michigan Light Artillery – (Robinson's Battery, Grand Rapids Battle Creek Area)
Battery "D" 1st Regiment Michigan Light Artillery
Battery "E" 1st Regiment Michigan Light Artillery
Battery "F" 1st Regiment Michigan Light Artillery
Battery "G" 1st Regiment Michigan Light Artillery
Battery "H" 1st Regiment Michigan Light Artillery – (De Golyer's Battery)
Battery "I" 1st Regiment Michigan Light Artillery
Battery "K" 1st Regiment Michigan Light Artillery
Battery "L" 1st Regiment Michigan Light Artillery
Battery "M" 1st Regiment Michigan Light Artillery
6th Regiment Michigan Volunteer Heavy Artillery
13th Independent Battery Michigan Light Artillery
14th Independent Battery Michigan Light Artillery

Engineers
1st Regiment Michigan Volunteer Engineers and Mechanics
Howland's Company Michigan Volunteer Engineers

Michigan Cavalry Brigade

The Michigan Cavalry Brigade was a brigade of volunteer cavalry during the latter half of the war. Composed primarily of the 1st, 5th, 6th and 7th Michigan Cavalry Regiments the Michigan Brigade fought in every major campaign of the Army of the Potomac from the Battle of Gettysburg in July 1863 to the Confederate surrender at Appomattox Court House in April 1865.

See also
Minor Michigan Cavalry Units of the American Civil War
Minor Michigan infantry units of the American Civil War
Lists of American Civil War Regiments by State
United States Colored Troops

 01
Michigan
Civil War
Michigan in the American Civil War
.